Never Call Retreat: Lee and Grant: The Final Victory is the conclusion of an alternate history trilogy by former Speaker of the U.S. House of Representatives Newt Gingrich, William R. Forstchen, and Albert S. Hanser. It was published in 2005 by Thomas Dunne Books. The other two books are Grant Comes East and Gettysburg: A Novel of the Civil War. The novel is illustrated with actual photographs of the Civil War, taken somewhat out of context.

Plot
This book has Lee's army, fresh after defeating the Army of the Potomac at Gunpowder River. The Campaign begins after Grant completes transporting his army from the west and refitting it in Harrisburg, Pennsylvania. Grant makes the first move, and begins to march his newly minted Army of the Susquehanna southward down the Cumberland Valley toward Virginia. General George Armstrong Custer learns of Lee's movement of the pontoon train from a loyal Union railroad man, and decides it is an important enough prize that he must abandon his current mission, leaving Gen. Darius N. Couch without proper screening forces.  

The novel goes into extensive detail regarding battle plans, troop movements, and military strategies over a period of three days. In the end, Grant wins, barely. After Lee's surrender, Grant paroles Lee and his army, and declares a 30-day, unilateral truce, ostensibly to give the paroled Confederates time to return home, but more so to give Confederate President Jefferson Davis time to "come to his senses" and realize the war has been lost. Without an army, Davis is left with no choice but to surrender, ending the war.

Reception 
Kirkus Reviews said that this novel was "reasonably well-written and plausible, with excellent period photographs as a bonus. Still, there's so much good Civil War history to read that this what-if exercise seems more than a touch unnecessary."  Brad Hooper in his review for Booklist said that "as in the previous volumes in the trilogy, the authors' research is impeccable, and their presentation brings events down to a personal level, and, as in any good alternative vision of history, the reader is left believing it could really have happened this way."

Historical figures 
 Judah Benjamin, Confederate secretary of state
 George Armstrong Custer, U.S. general
 Jefferson Davis, Confederate president
 Ulysses S. Grant, U.S. general
 Winfield Scott Hancock, U.S. general
 Robert E. Lee, Confederate general
 Abraham Lincoln, U.S. president
 James Longstreet, Confederate general
 James B. McPherson, U.S. general
 Phillip Sheridan, U.S. general
 George Sykes, U.S. general
 Elihu B. Washburne, U.S. congressman
 Henry Jackson Hunt, U.S. chief of artillery
 Ely S. Parker, U. S. colonel, aide to General Grant.

References

2005 American novels
American alternate history novels
Collaborative novels
Novels by Newt Gingrich
Novels by William R. Forstchen
Novels set during the American Civil War
American Civil War alternate histories
Thomas Dunne Books books